Sir Victor Mallet  (9 April 1893 – 18 May 1969) was a British diplomat and author.

Career
Victor Alexander Louis Mallet was educated at Winchester College and Balliol College, Oxford. In 1914 he joined the Cambridgeshire Regiment and served during World War I with the British Expeditionary Force and later in Ireland, reaching the rank of Captain. He joined the Diplomatic Service in 1919 and held posts in Tehran 1919–22 and 1933–35, Buenos Aires 1926–28, Brussels 1929–32, Washington D.C. 1936–39 and in the Foreign Office 1922–26 and 1932. He was Envoy to Sweden 1940–45 during World War II and Ambassador to Spain 1945–46 and to Italy 1947–53.

Family
Victor Mallet was son of Sir Bernard Mallet and his wife Marie, daughter of Henry John Adeane by his wife, Lady Elizabeth Yorke, daughter of the 4th Earl of Hardwicke. His mother was a Maid of Honour to Queen Victoria and he was godson to the Queen. His book Life with Queen Victoria, a record of his mother's letters written during her service, was published in 1968.

He married Christiana Jean Andreae, daughter of Herman Anton Andreae, of Moundsmere Manor, in Hampshire, and his wife, Christiana Candida (née Ahrens) in 1925; they had three sons and a daughter, Anne Marie, who married Patrick Butler, 18th/28th Baron Dunboyne in 1950.

Publications
Life with Queen Victoria: Marie Mallet's Letters from Court, 1887-1901 (editor), John Murray, London, 1968.

Honours
Victor Mallet was appointed CMG in the New Year Honours of 1934 and CVO in 1939. He was knighted KCMG in the New Year Honours of 1944 and raised to GCMG in the Queen's Birthday Honours of 1952.

References
MALLET, Sir Victor Alexander Louis, Who Was Who, A & C Black, 1920–2007; online edn, Oxford University Press, Dec 2012
The Papers of Sir Victor Mallet, Churchill Archives Centre, University of Cambridge
Sir Victor Mallet (obituary), The Times, London, 19 May 1969, page 10

External links

1893 births
1969 deaths
People educated at Winchester College
Alumni of Balliol College, Oxford
Cambridgeshire Regiment officers
British Army personnel of World War I
Ambassadors of the United Kingdom to Sweden
Ambassadors of the United Kingdom to Spain
Ambassadors of the United Kingdom to Italy
Knights Grand Cross of the Order of St Michael and St George
Commanders of the Royal Victorian Order